The football tournament at the 1967 Southeast Asian Peninsular Games was held from 10 December to 16 December 1967 in Bangkok, Thailand.

Teams

Tournament

Group stage

Group A

Group B

Knockout stage

Semi-finals

Bronze medal match

Gold medal match

Winners

Medal winners

References 
Southeast Peninsular Asian Games 1967 at RSSSF
SEAP Games 1967 at AFF official website

Southeast
Football at the Southeast Asian Games
1967
1967 in Thai sport